Oliva rubrolabiata , common name the red-lip olive, is a species of sea snail, a marine gastropod mollusk in the family Olividae, the olives.

Description
The size of the shell varies between 35 mm and 47 mm.

Distribution
This marine species occurs off the New Hebrides, Vanuatu and New Caledonia.

References

 Fischer P. (1903). Description d´un Oliva provenant des Nouvelles Hébrides. J. de Conch. 50 pp. 409, 410

External links
 

rubrolabiata
Gastropods described in 1903